The 1969 Chatham Cup was the 42nd annual nationwide knockout football competition in New Zealand.

Early stages of the competition were run on a regional basis. In all, 89 teams took part in the competition. Note: Different sources give different numberings for the rounds of the competition: some start round one with the beginning of the regional qualifications; others start numbering from the first national knock-out stage. The former numbering scheme is used in this article.

The announcement of the start of the New Zealand National Soccer League in 1970 led to changes in the organisation of the Chatham Cup, and this was the last year prior to the creation of a more open draw.

The 1969 final
The last Chatham Cup to be decided on the old regional champions basis was 1969, and it again saw Eastern Suburbs reach the final, this time to face final debutants New Brighton. Despite the efforts of the southern defence, marshalled ably by keeper Derek Phillips, Suburbs had the better of the contest and scored two goals, one each from 1968 scorer John Wrathall and Billy de Graaf.

Results

Third Round

*Won on corners by KETCOB and Moturoa

Fourth Round

*Won on corners by Roslyn-Wakari

Fifth Round

Quarter-finals

Semi-finals

Final

References

Rec.Sport.Soccer Statistics Foundation New Zealand 1969 page
UltimateNZSoccer website 1969 Chatham Cup page

Chatham Cup
Chatham Cup
Chatham Cup
September 1969 sports events in New Zealand